Health extension officers or health extension workers (HEWs), are a category of health care providers found in some countries including Papua New Guinea and Ethiopia.  They usually work in health centres in rural and medically underserved areas, where they see and treat patients and provide a range of community health services.

Papua New Guinea
In Papua New Guinea, Health Extension Officers are trained with a Bachelor of Health Sciences in Rural Health. This study program is provided by one of the Universities in Papua New Guinea, the Divine Word University. The program which focuses upon preparation for clinical and administrative practices in the rural areas of Papua New Guinea where health services are at most times neglected. The four-year training program includes theoretical study in medicine, minor surgery, pediatrics, obstetric and gynecology, health awareness, health research, rural health facility management, health project management etc, as well as extended placements in hospitals and health centers for practical application of learning. Health Extension Officers are responsible for patient care, the administration of the local health centre, and the coordination of community health services.

Ethiopia
In Ethiopia, against a backdrop of acute physician shortage, Health Extension Workers are assigned to local health posts and provide a package of essential interventions to meet population health needs at this level. Through the national Health Extension Program, HEWs are recruited among high school graduates in local communities, and undergo a one-year training program to deliver a package of preventive and basic curative services that fall under four main components: hygiene and environmental sanitation; family health services; disease prevention and control; and health education and communication.

See also
Health workforce
Clinical officers
Clinical associates
Community health workers
Physician assistants

References

Health care occupations
Health in Papua New Guinea
Healthcare in Ethiopia